Lasta is a small mountain village and a community in the municipal unit of Vytina, Arcadia, Greece It is considered a traditional settlement and is 6 km northwest of Vytina. The community consists of the villages Lasta and Agridaki.

References

See also
List of settlements in Arcadia
List of traditional settlements of Greece

Populated places in Arcadia, Peloponnese
Vytina